Urmia County is in West Azerbaijan province, Iran. The capital of the county is the city of Urmia. At the 2006 census, the county's population was 856,914 in 215,342 households. The following census in 2011 counted 963,738 people in 272,439 households. At the 2016 census, the county's population was 1,040,565 in 304,306 households.

Administrative divisions

The population history of Urmia County's administrative divisions over three consecutive censuses is shown in the following table. The latest census shows five districts, 20 rural districts, and five cities.

References

 

Counties of West Azerbaijan Province